Richard Laimbeer Sanford (December 19, 1877 – June 15, 1966) was an American middle-distance runner. He competed in the men's 2590 metres steeplechase at the 1904 Summer Olympics.

References

External links
 

1877 births
1966 deaths
Athletes (track and field) at the 1904 Summer Olympics
American male middle-distance runners
American male steeplechase runners
Olympic track and field athletes of the United States
Place of birth missing